True-Life Adventures is a series of short and full-length nature documentary films released by Walt Disney Productions between the years 1948 and 1960. The first seven films released were thirty-minute shorts, with the subsequent seven films being full features. The series won eight Academy Awards for the studio, including five for Best Two Reel Live Action Short and three for Best Documentary Feature.

Some of the features were re-edited into educational shorts between 1968 and 1975. The latter year saw the release of The Best of Walt Disney's True-Life Adventures, a compilation film derived from the series.

Films

Production 
The films were among the earliest production experience for Roy E. Disney. This series was the launching pad for Disney's then-new distributor, the Buena Vista Film Distribution Company, Inc. Interstitial animated segments are included, and some filmed sequences are set to music. Ub Iwerks blew up the 16 mm film to 35 mm for theatrical projection and provided some special effects.

Awards 
The series won eight Academy Awards for the studio including five Best Two Reel Live Action Short awards for Seal Island, In Beaver Valley, Nature's Half Acre, Water Birds, and Bear Country, and three Academy Award for Best Documentary Feature awards for The Living Desert, The Vanishing Prairie and White Wilderness.

In other media 
Television episodes from Disney's anthology TV series focus on the films, and it inspired a daily panel comic strip that was distributed from 1955 to 1973 and drawn by George Wheeler. Several of the films were adapted in comic book format as one-shots in Dell Comics' Four Color series.

Nature's Living Album - Educational series 
The following shorts were edited out of the other shorts/films/episodes for educational purposes. Either a fragment was exported out of a longer film or two or more sequences were edited together from more than two or more different films to form a "new" film. Thus they are not included on the Legacy DVDs.

Films made up of stock footage from two or more Disney True-Life Adventures films and thus not listed with respective original film above:

The Weasel Family (1968) 
 The Wild Dog Family – The Coyote (1968)
 The Wild Cat Family – The Cougar (1968)
 The Deer Family (1968)
 The Beasts of Burden Family (1970)
 The Bear Family (1970)

Documentary film 

On October 8, 1975, Disney theatrically released The Best of Walt Disney's True-Life Adventures, a full-length motion picture documentary derived from 13 of the acclaimed True-Life Adventures films. It was written and directed by James Algar, and narrated by Winston Hibler.

Home media

VHS releases

Australian & New Zealand 
 The Living Desert (September 22, 1995)
 The Vanishing Prairie (September 22, 1995)
 Jungle Cat (September 22, 1995)
 Secrets of Life (September 22, 1995)
 The African Lion (September 22, 1995)
 White Wilderness (September 22, 1995)
 Seal Island (March 15, 1996)
 Bear Country (March 15, 1996)
 Water Birds (March 15, 1996)
 The Olympic Elk (March 15, 1996)
 Beaver Valley (March 15, 1996)
 Nature's Half Acre (March 15, 1996)

DVD release 
All of the True-Life Adventures have been released on 4 double-DVD sets as part of the Walt Disney Legacy Collection, which launched December 5, 2006.

Volume 1: Wonders of the World 
Disc 1
 Introduction by Roy Disney
 White Wilderness (1958) 
 Water Birds (1952)
 Beaver Valley (1950)
 Prowlers of the Everglades (1953)

Disc 2
 Mysteries of the Deep
 "Wonders of the Water Worlds"
 "The Crisler Story"

Bonus Features
 "Backstage with Roy Disney at Disney's Animal Kingdom: Birds"
 "Tribute to James Algar"
 "Filmmakers' Journal"
 "Collectors' Corner"
 "Original Theatrical Trailers"

Volume 2: Lands of Exploration 
Disc 1
 Introduction by Roy Disney
 The Living Desert
 The Vanishing Prairie
 Seal Island

Disc 2
 Islands of the Sea
 Nature's Strangest Creatures
 "Prairie"
 Behind the True Life Cameras

Bonus Features
 Backstage with Roy Disney at Disney's Animal Kingdom: Desert Insects
 Backstage with Roy Disney at Disney's Animal Kingdom: Snakes
 Filmmakers' Journal
 Collectors' Corner
 Trailers & Promo

Volume 3: Creatures of the Wild 
Disc 1
 Introduction by Roy Disney
 The African Lion
 Jungle Cat
 Bear Country

Disc 2
 The Olympic Elk
 "Cameras in Africa"
 "The Yellowstone Story"

Bonus Features
 Tribute to the Milottes
 Backstage with Roy Disney at Disney's Animal Kingdom: Elephants
 Backstage with Roy Disney at Disney's Animal Kingdom: Cheetah Medical Exam
 Filmmakers' Journal
 Collectors' Corner
 Trailers & Promo

Volume 4: Nature's Mysteries 
Disc 1
 Introduction by Roy Disney
 Secrets of Life
 Perri

Disc 2
 Nature's Half Acre
 "Searching for Nature's Mysteries"
 "Adventure in Wildwood Heart'

Bonus Features
 Backstage with Roy Disney at Disney's Animal Kingdom: Butterflies
 Tribute to Winston Hibler
 Filmmakers' Journal
 Collectors' Corner
 Original Theatrical Trailers

Disney+ 
Many of the films are hosted on Disney's streaming platform Disney+, although as of March 1, 2022, some had not yet been added to the service in the United States, including Seal Island and White Wilderness.

Reception 
Although critics denounced the series' anthropomorphizing of animals, educators honored the True-Life Adventures films. In 1954, the professional teacher organization Phi Delta Kappa International awarded Walt Disney its Education Award, and the National Education Association honored him with the American Education Award.

Legacy 
A 1982 Canadian Broadcasting Company documentary titled Cruel Camera interviews a cameraman who worked on the series, who said he disliked the inaccuracy of the narration. In a notorious example he discussed, the lemmings' mass suicide in White Wilderness was staged, with the same small group of lemmings repeatedly shoved off a cliffside—rather than hundreds intentionally jumping as stated by the narrator—into Alberta's Bow River, rather than the Arctic Ocean as is depicted. In 2003, the Alaska Department of Fish and Game discussed the lemming-suicide myth and in 2022, business magnate Elon Musk referred to the story after calling for Mickey Mouse to be released into the public domain, tweeting, "Ironic that Disney would disparage an entire class of rodents when their main character is a rodentjealous maybe?"

In 2007, Disney established a new nature film label called Disneynature, which produces feature films similar to the True-Life Adventures series. On March 20, 2019, Disney acquired 21st Century Fox, including the nature-themed National Geographic Films.

See also 
 List of Disney live-action shorts
 List of Walt Disney Pictures films

Documentaries 
 Circle-Vision 360°
 People & Places

References

External links 
 Volume 1 DVD Stats
 Volume 2 DVD Stats
 Volume 3 DVD Stats
 Volume 4 DVD Stats
 True-Life Adventures at the INDUCKS
 

Film series introduced in 1948
Disney documentary films
Documentary film series
Films adapted into comics
Disney comic strips
Educational comics
1955 comics debuts
1971 comics endings
Comics about animals
American comic strips